Attorney General Clark may refer to:

Andrew Inglis Clark (1848–1907), Attorney-General of Tasmania
James Paul Clarke (1854–1916), Attorney General of Arkansas
Lewis Whitehouse Clark (1828–1900), Attorney General of New Hampshire
Lincoln Clark (1800–1886), Attorney General of Alabama
Ramsey Clark (1927–2021), Attorney General of the United States
Robert Clark (Australian politician) (born 1957), Attorney-General of Victoria
S. Wesley Clark (1872–1949), Attorney General of South Dakota
Steve Clark (Arkansas politician) (born 1947), Attorney General of Arkansas
Tom C. Clark (1899–1977), Attorney General of the United States
William G. Clark (1924–2001), Attorney General of Illinois

See also
 Attorney General Clarke (disambiguation)
 General Clark (disambiguation)